A leadership election was held by the Malaysian Chinese Association (MCA) on 21 December 2013. It was won by then Deputy President of MCA, Liow Tiong Lai.

Central Committee election results
Source

President

Deputy President

Vice Presidents

Central Working Committee Members

References

2013 elections in Malaysia
Malaysian Chinese Association leadership election
Malaysian Chinese Association leadership elections